The action of 4 April 1941 was a naval engagement fought during the Battle of the Atlantic during the Second World War. The German crew rescued the British survivors, some of whom were repatriated and gave an account to the Admiralty. It was accepted that German commerce raiders were too well-armed for converted ocean liners equipped with obsolete guns but nothing else was available to the Royal Navy until later in the war.

Background

Thor

During the 1930s, the  had paid banana plantations in Central America to have banana boats built by German yards, suitable for quick conversion for navy use. Such ships were faster than average freighters [] and sat lower in the water, making smaller targets. The ship was armed with six  guns, one  gun, two  Flak, four  Flak and four  torpedo tubes. The raider also carried an Arado Ar 196A-1 floatplane for reconnaissance and had a complement of 349 officers and crew.

HMS Voltaire
Voltaire, was built by Workman & Clark in 1923 as a passenger liner of the Lamport and Holt line, carrying passengers and freight between New York and Buenos Aires. Used first as a troopship and then as an accommodation ship at Scapa Flow, it was later sent to Wallsend and equipped as an armed merchant cruiser (AMC). Voltaire carried eight  and two  naval guns, including at least one anti-aircraft mount. Voltaire patrolled the Mediterranean enforcing contraband regulations then sailed to Halifax, Nova Scotia to escort convoys across the Atlantic. Having refitted at Saint John, New Brunswick, Voltaire sailed for Trinidad and was then sent to Freetown in Sierra Leone to look for commerce raiders.

Prelude

On 6 June 1941, Thor ( Otto Kähler) sailed on a raiding voyage to the central and south Atlantic, disguised as the Russian merchant ship Orsk, before sailing from Norway and passing through the Denmark Strait on 16 June. On 1 July, dressed up like a Jugoslav freighter, the Dutch Kertosono was intercepted and sent back to France as a prize. On 7 June the British Delambre was overhauled and sunk; two days later the Belgian ship Bruges was sunk. On 14 July, Gracefield hove to and was sunk; none of the ships got off a distress report. On 16 July, the British ship Wendover fought back and managed to transmit a report before being sunk by gunfire and torpedoes after the crew was taken prisoner, bringing the total to over 200 men. The Dutch Tela, carrying food was captured the next day which alleviated the difficulty of feeding the captives.

Wireless reports and overdue ships had indicated to the British that a raider was operating in the Atlantic and had sent Alcantara to investigate. Thor was armed with guns that considerably outranged the armament carried by Alcantara but Thor was slower and had to engage the AMC. In an engagement that lasted for about four hours, Thor inflicting serious damage and received two hits in return; Alcantara making slowly for Brazil. Thor sailed away to the south, behind a smoke screen, to complete repairs and rendezvous with a supply ship. On 26 September, in the south Atlantic,  the Norwegian ship Kosmos III was sunk then the British Natia on 8 October; now carrying more than 360 prisoners. on 9 November Thor rendezvoused with the blockade-runner Rio Grande which delivered supplies and took off most of the prisoners.

Thor out-gunned and out-ranged Carnarvon Castle but was too slow to out-run the AMC. Thor inflicted so much damage with its stern armament that the AMC had to make for port for repairs. Thor rendezvoused with Admiral Scheer and a captured freighter on 25 December, from which supplies were generously replenished. Several British cruisers were concentrated off the River Plate and Rio de Janeiro but Thor met few ships, apart from German supply vessels for three months. Thor communicated information of its superiority against the British AMCs which gave the crews of other raiders greater confidence against them. On 25 March 1941, the passenger liner Britannia was sunk and the occupants left behind in lifeboats because Thor intercepted an RRR (raider report) call from Britannia and a reply from what the captain took to be a British warship nearby. Later that day Thor sank the Swedish ship Trolleholm. In early April 1941, the AMC HMS Voltaire sailed from Trinidad in the Caribbean for Freetown, Sierra Leone and to search west of the Cape Verde islands for commerce raiders en route.

Action

On 4 April Thor was back in the area to the north-east of Brazil, posing as a Greek freighter and at 06:15 its lookouts reported smoke on the horizon to port. The ship was HMS Voltaire (Captain James Blackburn); Kähler turned toward the vessel, not realising that it was an AMC and the British assumed that they had met a small freighter and closed on it to check. Kähler was surprised when the ship returned fire and replied with two guns; this time, an AMC was well within range and converging when the engagement began. The German gun crews managed to hit Voltaire with their opening salvo of four shells destroying the radio room before an RRR report could be sent and destroyed the fire-control system. Voltaire was set on fire in four minutes.

With its fire control system out of action, Voltaire could not synchronise its 6-inch guns and its fire became slow and inaccurate. Blackburn abandoned the bridge when it was ablaze and went to the stern to command one of the two remaining 6-in guns but only managed to hit the top of Thors mast. Kähler fired two torpedoes from  but neither hit Voltaire. At about 08:00 Blackburn gave the order "abandon ship" and at 08:35 Voltaire rolled over and sank. Thor took aboard 189 survivors; 76 of the crew had been killed or died of wounds. In 55 minutes Thor had fired 724 rounds, inflicted many hits, for only minor damage.

Rather than leave the crew to be rescued, Kähler had the area was searched for five hours regardless of any ships appearing. Thor sailed north, changed disguise, rendezvoused with the tanker Ill, then made course for Europe. German wireless broadcasts made much of the sinking of Voltaire but did not disclose the identity of the raider. When the Germans announced the sinking of Voltaire, the Admiralty sent the Canadian AMC Prince David to search, which found wreckage half-way between Trinidad and the Cape Verde Islands. The British were ignorant of the details of the engagement until survivors were repatriated from Germany.

Aftermath
Thor reached the Bay of Biscay on 23 April and slipped up the Channel and arrived at Hamburg on 30 April. The Admiralty understood how inadvisable it was to fit obsolete guns on slow and old liners as trade protection vessels but lacked the modern guns and ships to take on German commerce-raiders until later in the war. Thor made another cruise in 1942 but was burned out in Yokohama, when the supply ship Uckermarck alongside, suffered an explosion and fire while its fuel tanks were being cleaned.

See also
 Single ship action
 Northern Patrol

Notes

Footnotes

References

 
 
 
 
 
 
 

A
Naval battles of World War II involving Germany
Battle of the Atlantic
April 1941 events
Germany–United Kingdom military relations